The 1976–77 Winnipeg Jets season was the Jets' fifth season of operation in the World Hockey Association (WHA). The Jets, the defending WHA champions, made it to the Avco Cup final before losing to the Quebec Nordiques.

Offseason

Regular season

Final standings

Schedule and results

Playoffs
The Jets lost in the Avco Cup Finals.

Winnipeg Jets 4, San Diego Mariners 3

Winnipeg Jets 4, Houston Aeros 2

Quebec Nordiques 4, Winnipeg Jets 3 – Avco Cup Finals

Player statistics

Regular season
Scoring

Goaltending

Playoffs
Scoring

Goaltending

Awards and records

Transactions

Draft picks
Winnipeg's draft picks at the 1976 WHA Amateur Draft.

Farm teams

See also
1976–77 WHA season

References

External links

Winnipeg Jets (1972–1996) seasons
Winn
Winn